Jacques Herbrand (12 February 1908 – 27 July 1931) was a French mathematician. Although he died at age 23, he was already considered one of "the greatest mathematicians of the younger generation" by his professors Helmut Hasse and Richard Courant.

He worked in mathematical logic and class field theory. He introduced recursive functions. Herbrand's theorem refers to either of two completely different theorems. One is a result from his doctoral thesis in proof theory, and the other one half of the Herbrand–Ribet theorem. The Herbrand quotient is a type of Euler characteristic, used in homological algebra. He contributed to Hilbert's program in the foundations of mathematics by providing a constructive consistency proof for a weak system of arithmetic. The proof uses the above-mentioned, proof-theoretic Herbrand's theorem.

Biography
Herbrand finished his doctorate at École Normale Supérieure in Paris under Ernest Vessiot in 1929. He joined the army in October 1929, however, and so did not defend his thesis at the Sorbonne until the following year. He was awarded a Rockefeller fellowship that enabled him to study in Germany in 1931, first with John von Neumann in Berlin, then during June with Emil Artin in Hamburg, and finally with Emmy Noether in Göttingen.

He submitted his principal study of proof theory and general recursive functions "On the consistency of arithmetic" early in 1931. While the essay was under consideration, Gödel's "On formally undecidable sentences of Principia Mathematica and related systems I" announced the (general) impossibility of proving the consistency of a theory, using merely the theory itself. Herbrand studied Gödel's essay and wrote an appendix to his own study explaining why Gödel's result did not contradict his own. "On the consistency of arithmetic" was published posthumously.

Death 
In July of 1931, Herbrand was mountain-climbing in the French Alps with two friends when he fell to his death in the granite mountains of Massif des Écrins.

Quotation
"Jacques Herbrand would have hated Bourbaki" said French mathematician Claude Chevalley quoted in Michèle Chouchan, "Nicolas Bourbaki Faits et légendes", Éditions du choix, 1995.

Bibliography
 

Primary literature:
 1967. Jean van Heijenoort (ed.), From Frege to Gödel: A Source Book in Mathematical Logic, 1879–1931. Cambridge, Massachusetts: Harvard Univ. Press.
 1930. "Investigations in proof theory," 525–81.
 1931. "On the consistency of arithmetic," 618–28.
 1968. Jean van Heijenoort (ed.), Jacques Herbrand, Écrits logiques. Paris: Presses Universitaires de France.
 1971. Warren David Goldfarb (transl., ed.), Logical Writings of Jacques Herbrand Cambridge, Massachusetts: Harvard University Press.

See also
 Herbrand interpretation
 Herbrand structure
 Herbrand Award – by the Conference on Automated Deduction, for automated deduction
 Prix Jacques Herbrand – by the French Academy of Sciences, for mathematics and physics
 Herbrandization – a validity-preserving normal form of a formula, dual to Skolemization
 Herbrand's theorem on ramification groups
 Rollo Davidson (1944–1970) – another mathematician who died in a mountain climbing accident
 (Gödel-Herbrand) computability thesis: before Church and Turing, in 1933 with Kurt Gödel, they created a formal definition of a class called general recursive functions.

References

External links
 

1908 births
1931 deaths
French logicians
Logicians
École Normale Supérieure alumni
University of Paris alumni
Proof theorists
20th-century French mathematicians
French male non-fiction writers
Mountaineering deaths
Sport deaths in France
Scientists from Paris
20th-century French philosophers
20th-century French male writers